Joseph Crowley (born March 16, 1962) is a former American politician and consultant who served as U.S. Representative from New York's 14th congressional district from 1999 to 2019. He was defeated by Democratic primary challenger Alexandria Ocasio-Cortez in what was viewed as one of the biggest upsets of the 2018 midterm elections.

During his tenure, Crowley served as Chair of the House Democratic Caucus from 2017 to 2019, as well as the local chairman of the Queens County Democratic Party from 2006 to 2019. He previously served in the New York State Assembly from 1987 to 1998. After leaving Congress, he joined the Washington, D.C. lobbying and law firm Squire Patton Boggs. He left that firm in 2022 and joined the rival law firm Dentons.

Early life and education
Crowley was born in Woodside, Queens, New York City, to Joseph F. Crowley Sr., an Irish American, and Eileen Crowley, who emigrated from County Armagh, Northern Ireland. Crowley Sr. served in the United States Army during the Korean War, later becoming a lawyer and a New York City Police Department detective. Crowley Jr. is the second of four siblings. Crowley Jr.'s paternal uncle Walter H. Crowley was a New York City councilman, and is the namesake of Crowley Playground in Elmhurst, Queens.

Crowley attended private Roman Catholic schools in the city, graduating from Power Memorial Academy in Manhattan in 1981. He graduated from Queens College in 1985 with a degree in political science and communications.

Career

New York Assembly
He was a member of the New York State Assembly from 1987 to 1998, sitting in the 187th, 188th, 189th, 190th, 191st and 192nd New York State Legislatures. Because of his Irish roots, he quickly became involved in Irish-American politics throughout New York.

U.S. House of Representatives

Democratic Congressman Thomas J. Manton announced his retirement from Congress in 1998, having already filed for and circulated petitions for reelection. He withdrew on the last day it was legally possible to do so and arranged for Crowley, his chosen successor, to replace him on the ballot. Crowley was not aware of this until Manton phoned him to tell him his name would be on the general election ballot.

Prior to redistricting for the 2012 election, Crowley represented the 7th District, which encompassed portions of Queens and the Bronx. It included neighborhoods such as Woodside, Jackson Heights, East Elmhurst, and College Point, in Queens as well as the neighborhoods of Castle Hill, Co-op City, Parkchester, Throgs Neck, Morris Park, Pelham Parkway, Pelham Bay, Country Club, and City Island in the eastern Bronx.

After 2013, Crowley represented New York's 14th congressional district, which includes the eastern Bronx and part of north-central Queens. The Queens portion includes the neighborhoods of Sunnyside, Astoria, College Point, East Elmhurst, Jackson Heights, Corona and Woodside. The Bronx portion of the district includes the neighborhoods of Morris Park, Parkchester, Pelham Bay, and Throgs Neck as well as City Island.

On June 26, 2018, Crowley was defeated in the Democratic primary by Alexandria Ocasio-Cortez.

Committee assignments

 Committee on Ways and Means
 Subcommittee on Social Security
 Subcommittee on Select Revenue Measures

Caucus memberships

 Ad Hoc Committee on Irish Affairs, Co-Chair
 Rare Disease Congressional Caucus, Co-Chair
 Congressional Musicians Caucus, Founder and Chair
 Bangladesh Caucus, Founder and Chair
 Congressional Caucus on India and Indian-Americans, former co-chair
 Animal Protection Caucus
 Congressional Arts Caucus
 Congressional Historic Preservation Caucus
 Congressional LGBT Equality Caucus
 Congressional Pro-Choice Caucus
 National Service Caucus
 Congressional Asian Pacific American Caucus

Tenure 
Crowley served as Democratic Caucus Chairman of the United States House of Representatives, the fourth highest leadership position in the House Democratic Caucus.

Crowley's cousin, New York City firefighter John Moran, was killed as a result of the terrorist attacks of September 11, 2001. Crowley authored a bill that provided the 9/11 Heroes Medal of Valor to all emergency workers who died as a result of the terrorist acts. He also created the Urban Area Security Initiative, which directs money to prevent terrorism toward regions that are seen as the most threatened.

Crowley, who has spent much time in India, created a Bangladesh caucus and was formerly the chair of the India Caucus.

On October 10, 2002, Crowley was among the 81 House Democrats who voted in favor of authorizing the invasion of Iraq.

Crowley joined Bronx Representative José E. Serrano in 2008 in proposing legislation to help clean up PCB-contaminated schools.

In April 2011, Crowley received media attention for an angry "speech" he gave without actually speaking. Crowley ripped pieces of paper with words to deliver his message.

Crowley was first elected to the U.S. House of Representatives in 1998. The seat was considered open after incumbent Thomas J. Manton retired.

In the June 26, 2018, Democratic primary for New York's 14th congressional district, Crowley was defeated by challenger Alexandria Ocasio-Cortez, who received 57% of the vote, in what was seen as a massive upset. Crowley remained on the general election ballot under the Working Families Party line. Ocasio-Cortez called on Crowley to take his name off the ballot, but he responded that he could not unless he moved, died, was convicted of a felony, or filed to run for another office in November as a paper candidate (which he claimed would be a form of electoral fraud). Ocasio-Cortez defeated Crowley and Republican Anthony Pappas in the November 6 general election, with Crowley receiving 7% of the vote.

In February 2019, Crowley resigned as Chair of the Queens Democratic Party and signed on to the lobbying firm Squire Patton Boggs. June Bunch was selected to serve as Chair on an interim basis. Crowley also became honorary co-chair of the Pass USMCA Coalition, an umbrella organization working to pass USMCA, the Trump administration's replacement for the North American Free Trade Agreement.

In May 2019, Crowley joined the board of Northern Swan Holdings Inc., an investment firm focused on hemp and marijuana cultivation in Colombia, along with former Senate Majority Leader Tom Daschle.

Political positions

Abortion 
Since 2005, Crowley consistently received ratings of 0% from the National Right to Life Committee and 100% from the NARAL. In 2011, he opposed a bill that would have banned taxpayer funding for abortions, and in the 2010 election, he was endorsed by Planned Parenthood. In 2018, Crowley received a voting record of 100% from Planned Parenthood.

Health care 
Since 2007, he received a rating of 100% from the American Public Health Association, the American Nurses Association, and the National Breast Cancer Coalition.

Crowley fought against the practice of female genital mutilation (FGM), both abroad and in the United States. In 2010, he introduced the Girls Protection Act of 2010, which would criminalize the transport of a girl under the age of 18 years old to undergo FGM.

In 2015, he proposed a bill with Representative Sheila Jackson Lee encouraging the collection of data on the prevalence of FGM, and to create a plan to better prevent the practice, which is illegal in the United States.

Crowley was a consistent supporter of the 2010 Patient Protection and Affordable Care Act (known as "Obamacare", or "ACA"). On March 22, 2010, he said: "I... support the Patient Protection and Affordable Care Act, a historic measure that will put families first when it comes to accessing health care coverage." He opposed repealing the act, and voted against a repeal on January 19, 2011. Also in 2011, he held an event to celebrate the one-year anniversary of the bill's passage.

In 2017, Crowley signed on to H.R. 676, the Expanded and Improved Medicare for All Act. This bill was introduced by former Michigan Congressman John Conyers in January 2017.

Immigration 
Crowley has been a heavy critic of President Trump's plan to build a wall on the U.S.–Mexico border and his decision to end DACA and Temporary Protected Status protection for qualifying immigrants in 2017. In 2017, Crowley introduced a bill that would grant green cards to undocumented workers who helped to recover and clean up New York City after the terrorist attacks on September 11.

Economy and budget 

Crowley holds the view "that reducing barriers to investment, creating opportunities for small businesses, and providing equitable working conditions for all Americans can and should be part of our national economic policy". He supported federal spending as a way to increase economic growth. In 2008, he endorsed the Financial Asset Purchase Authority and Tax Law Amendments, which established the Troubled Assets Relief Program (TARP) and allowed the Secretary of the Treasury to buy assets from troubled financial institutions.

Crowley advocated tax increases on the highest tax brackets, tax cuts for the middle class, and reduced defense spending. When serving on the Ways and Means Committee, he stated: "I really don't see how it's justifiable or sensible to give a tax cut to the wealthiest among us, but at the same time increase taxes on U.S. soldiers." He also applauded the 2009 Budget for ending the Alternative Minimum Tax, and ensuring tax cuts for 23 million middle-class Americans. In 2011, he opposed a bill that appropriated funds to the defense budget.

In 2017, Crowley opposed the Tax Cuts and Jobs Act of 2017, saying its only goal was to give more tax cuts to America's top 1% than the working class. In December 2017, Crowley said in a floor speech: "It's a scam, and the American people know it. Is this a bill that helps people who are living paycheck to paycheck? Hell, no."

Other positions 

Crowley proposed legislation to improve conditions for renters in his district. In September 2017, he introduced the Rent Relief Act, which would give refundable tax credits to renters.

Crowley had a 2016 score of 95% from the League of Conservation Voters.

Crowley's Irish roots influenced his policy decisions in Congress as a member of the Friends of Ireland Caucus. He worked on peace efforts for the conflict in Northern Ireland and securing refuge for those affected by it. Crowley spoke out against President Trump's effort to eliminate the position of United States Special Envoy for Northern Ireland. Trump eventually reversed this decision. Crowley was named "Irish-American of the year" by the Irish Echo in 2018.

Crowley voted in favor of the Authorization for Use of Military Force Against Iraq Resolution of 2002.

In January 2017, Crowley voted for a House resolution condemning the UN Security Council Resolution 2334, which called Israeli settlement building in the occupied Palestinian territories a flagrant violation of international law and a major obstacle to peace.

Career after Congress 
After leaving Congress in 2019, he joined the Washington, D. C. lobbying and law firm Squire Patton Boggs. In 2022, he left Squire Patton Boggs to move to the Dentons’ Law Firm, also based in Washington, D.C.

Personal life
Crowley is married to Kasey Crowley, a registered nurse. They have three children: Cullen, Kenzie, and Liam. He is the cousin of former New York City Councilwoman Elizabeth Crowley.

Electoral history

See also 
 1998 New York's 7th congressional district election
 2000 New York's 7th congressional district election
 2002 New York's 7th congressional district election
 2004 New York's 7th congressional district election
 2006 New York's 7th congressional district election
 2008 New York's 7th congressional district election
 2010 New York's 7th congressional district election
 2012 New York's 14th congressional district election
 2014 New York's 14th congressional district election
 2016 New York's 14th congressional district election
 2018 New York's 14th congressional district election

References

External links

 
 

|-

|-

|-

|-

|-

|-

|-

1962 births
20th-century American politicians
21st-century American politicians
American people of Irish descent
American people of Northern Ireland descent
Businesspeople in the cannabis industry
Democratic Party members of the United States House of Representatives from New York (state)
Living people
Democratic Party members of the New York State Assembly
People from Queens, New York
Queens College, City University of New York alumni
People associated with Squire Patton Boggs